Ronnie Washington (born July 29, 1963) is a former American football linebacker. He played for the Atlanta Falcons in 1985, the Los Angeles Raiders in 1987 and for the Indianapolis Colts in 1989.

References

1963 births
Living people
American football linebackers
Louisiana–Monroe Warhawks football players
Atlanta Falcons players
Los Angeles Raiders players
Indianapolis Colts players